is a Japanese swimmer. He competed in the men's 200 metre breaststroke at the 2019 World Aquatics Championships.

References

External links
 

1994 births
Living people
Place of birth missing (living people)
Swimmers at the 2014 Asian Games
Asian Games medalists in swimming
Asian Games silver medalists for Japan
Medalists at the 2014 Asian Games
Japanese male breaststroke swimmers
Competitors at the 2013 Summer Universiade
Medalists at the 2015 Summer Universiade
Universiade silver medalists for Japan
Universiade bronze medalists for Japan
Universiade medalists in swimming
21st-century Japanese people